Philip Yenyo is a Native American civil rights activist. He is one of several prominent activists to spearhead the movement against the use of Native American imagery as sports mascots.

Early life
Philip John Yenyo was born on 26 October 1965 to Adeline Ramirez (mother, Spanish Mexican) and John Yenyo (father, Hungarian) in Cleveland, Ohio, United States. He has identified as Cherokee and Mexica, although his family genealogy does not show any American Indian / Native American lineage.

Career
Yenyo currently claims to be executive director of the state of Ohio's chapter of the American Indian Movement (Ohio AIM). He is a former co-chair for The Committee of 500 Years of Dignity and Resistance. The latter organization serves as an indigenous-supportive, multicultural organization dedicated to bolstering the cultural human heritage rights of indigenous people who live in the Northeast Ohio region. 

On May 13, 2021, Yenyo was informed by the American Indian Movement Grand Governing Council (AIM GCC) that Ohio AIM was unsanctioned. In a letter signed by Lisa Bellanger (Executive Director of AIM GCC) and Frank Paro (President of AIM GCC), and posted to Facebook, Yenyo was told to cease and desist from using the American Indian Movement name or representing himself as affiliated with AIM Ohio, due to "Continued verbal attacks and lateral attacks of women leadership with the AIMGCC via social media and radio shows."It has also been determined that Philip J. Yenyo has no authorization from AIM National and AIMGCC to speak, act or organize on behalf of the AIMGCC or AIM National. AIM National and AIMGCC orders [sic] Philip J. Yenyo to Cease and Desist any act representing the AIMGCC. The behavior, actions and attacks taken by Philip J. Yenyo is viewed as dishonorable, divisive, and slanderous.As of October 2021, Yenyo continues to represent himself on Facebook as a leader of the American Indian Movement and accept donations.

Activism
Yenyo has dedicated a significant portion of resources to protesting the use of Chief Wahoo mascot by the Cleveland Indians. "I would like to see the name and logo changed. Both have to go." Of the logo, Yenyo has stated, "But I think our people and others have come to realize that this caricature of our people as a red-face, smiling savage does great harm to us and our culture and has done so for many years." "This imagery, most sports teams are named after animals and they put us in that same category. We're human beings. We're still a living culture and we still exist." He has also explicated on the exploitation of other items of sacred significance to American Indian. "When we tell people that the feather is sacred to us, it's a sacred as a Christian cross, some of them start to come around and start understanding," he said. "When you start to explain to people how it affects us as a people and it puts us in a category with animals, they begin to see our side."

See also
 Robert Roche
Sundance

References

External links

American Indian Movement Grand Governing Council
Cleveland American Indian Movement

Members of the American Indian Movement
Activists from Ohio
People from Olmsted Falls, Ohio
People from Cleveland
Living people
1965 births